Mimoblennius atrocinctus, the banded blenny, is a species of combtooth blenny found in the western Pacific and eastern Indian oceans.  This species grows to a length of  TL.

This is a rare species in which the adults live along rocky coastline to a depth of  where they inhabit the abandoned tubes created by worms either alone or in loose aggregations. Their eggs are demersal and adhere to the substrate by an adhesive pad or pedestal which is filamentous. The larvae are planktonic and are frequently recorded from shallow waters near the coast. 

It has been recorded from the Indian Ocean off Sri Lanka and Christmas Island while in the western Pacific it has been recorded and from southern Japan to Hong Kong. It has also been recorded from northern Sulawesi and northern Australia.

References

External links
 

atrocinctus
Fish described in 1909